The 2012 Volkswagen Challenger was a professional tennis tournament played on carpet courts. It was the 19th edition of the tournament which was part of the 2012 ATP Challenger Tour. It took place in Wolfsburg, Germany between 20 and 26 February 2012.

Singles main-draw entrants

Seeds

 1 Rankings are as of February 13, 2012.

Other entrants
The following players received wildcards into the singles main draw:
  Richard Becker
  Ilija Bozoljac
  Nils Langer
  Sebastian Rieschick

The following players received entry from the qualifying draw:
  Evgeny Korolev
  Andrej Martin
  Luca Vanni
  Marcel Zimmermann

Champions

Singles

 Igor Sijsling def.  Jerzy Janowicz, 4–6, 6–3, 7–6(11–9)

Doubles

 Laurynas Grigelis /  Uladzimir Ignatik def.  Tomasz Bednarek /  Olivier Charroin, 7–5, 4–6, [10–5]

External links
Official Website
ITF Search
ATP official site

Volkswagen Challenger
Volkswagen Challenger
2012 in German tennis